The Mumbai World Trade Centre at Cuffe Parade is a skyscraper  built in the year 1970. It is the first world trade center in India. It consists of two towers, the M. Visvesaraya Industrial Research and Development Centre (MVIRDC) and the IDBI. MVIRDC is also known as Centre 1. At 155.9 m, it was the tallest building in South Asia for nearly four decades, until the completion of Planet Godrej (181 m) in 2009. It was constructed by the Shapoorji Pallonji Group.

In 1998, the Brihanmumbai Electricity Supply and Transport (BEST) commenced air conditioned bus services connecting the World Trade Centre with the suburb of Andheri. Further, Special 2 buses are also running between Mumbai CSMT and the World Trade Center.

References

See also
List of world trade centers
List of tallest buildings in Mumbai
List of tallest buildings in India
List of tallest buildings and structures in the Indian subcontinent
List of tallest twin buildings and structures

Buildings and structures in Mumbai
Mumbai
Marketing in India
Skyscraper office buildings in Mumbai
Buildings and structures completed in 1970
1970 establishments in Maharashtra